Essex is a county in the east of England. It is bounded by Suffolk and Cambridgeshire to the north, Hertfordshire to the west, Greater London to the south-west, Kent across the River Thames to the south, and the North Sea to the east. At the top level of local government are Essex County Council and two unitary authorities, Southend-on-Sea and Thurrock. Under the county council, there are twelve district and borough councils.

Local nature reserves (LNRs) are designated by local authorities under the National Parks and Access to the Countryside Act 1949. The local authority must have legal control over the site, by owning or leasing it or having an agreement with the owner. LNRs are sites which have a special local interest either biologically or geologically, and local authorities have a duty to care for them. They can apply local bye-laws to manage and protect LNRs.

As of August 2016 there are forty-nine local nature reserves in Essex. Nine are also Sites of Special Scientific Interest (SSSI), three are also scheduled monuments and four are managed by the Essex Wildlife Trust.

Key

Access
 FP = public access only to footpaths through the site
 NO = no public access
 PP = free public access to part of the site
 Yes   = free public access to all or most of the site

Other classifications
 EWT = Essex Wildlife Trust
 Ramsar = Ramsar site
 SPA = Special Protection Area
 SM = Scheduled monument
 SSSI = Site of Special Scientific Interest

Sites

See also

List of Sites of Special Scientific Interest in Essex
Essex Wildlife Trust

Notes

References

 
Essex